North Isles are the northern islands of the Shetland Islands, Scotland.

North Isles may also refer to:

 North Isles (Orkney ward), Scotland
 North Isles (Shetland ward),  Scotland